The Laser class at the 2011 ISAF Sailing World Championships was held in Perth, Western Australia between 12 and 18 December 2011.

Results

References

External links

Laser
Laser World Championships